Zmulner See is a mire lake in Carinthia, Austria. It is located in the upper Glan valley, near the municipality of Liebenfels. The lake and its environment are part of a protected landscape area.

External links
 Information page from the Carinthian Institute of Limnology

Lakes of Carinthia (state)